Led Zeppelin's Spring 1970 North American Tour was the fifth concert tour of North America by the English rock band. The tour commenced on 21 March and concluded on 18 April 1970. It took place a little over a week after the conclusion of their recent European concert tour.

Overview
In many respects this tour was a tremendous success for the band, as they grossed a total of over $1,200,000, and broke attendance records at their Canadian concerts in Montreal, Quebec and Vancouver, British Columbia.  The band were also made honorary citizens of the city of Memphis.

However, this stint of concerts also featured many unsavoury crowd control problems, with the shows often descending into violent confrontations between young concert-goers and the police. The tour occurred at a time when civil tension was very high in the United States, with numerous demonstrations taking place against the Vietnam War. On occasion Led Zeppelin were refused service in restaurants and in Texas they had a gun pulled on them.

Singer Robert Plant's observations of these disturbing events would prompt him to write some reflective lyrics for the song "That's the Way", which was composed just after the completion of this tour at Bron-Yr-Aur, and was later recorded for the band's forthcoming album Led Zeppelin III.

This was also the fateful tour during which guitarist Jimmy Page's 1960 Gibson Les Paul "Black Beauty" was stolen in an airport in Canada. In 2016, the guitar was returned to Page.

Initially, Stone the Crows were announced as the support act for the tour, but this arrangement was cancelled. During this tour and on all subsequent tours, the band dispensed with using any support bands for their concerts.

The final date of this tour, at Las Vegas, was cancelled as a result of cumulative strain on Plant's voice.

Tour set list
The fairly typical set list for the tour was:

"We're Gonna Groove" (King, Bethea)
"I Can't Quit You Baby" (Dixon) (Dropped after 25 March)
"Dazed and Confused" (Page)
"Heartbreaker" (Bonham, Jones Page, Plant)
"Bring It On Home" (Page, Plant, Dixon) (Added on 27 March) 
"White Summer"/"Black Mountain Side" (Page)
"Since I've Been Loving You" (Page, Plant, Jones)
"Organ Solo"/"Thank You" (Page, Plant, Jones)
"What Is and What Should Never Be" (Page, Plant)
"Moby Dick" (Page, Jones, Bonham)
"How Many More Times" (Page, Plant, Jones, Bonham)

Encores:
"Whole Lotta Love" (Dixon, Page, Plant, Jones, Bonham)
"Communication Breakdown" (Page, Jones, Bonham) (On 21 March and 27 March)

There were some set list substitutions, variations, and order switches during the tour.

Tour dates

References

External links
Comprehensive archive of known concert appearances by Led Zeppelin (official website)
Led Zeppelin concert setlists

Sources
Lewis, Dave and Pallett, Simon (1997) Led Zeppelin: The Concert File, London: Omnibus Press. .

Led Zeppelin concert tours
1970 concert tours
1970 in North America